Wasan Thanapat (Charam) is a Thai footballer. Since 2010, he has played for the Thai Premier League side, Pattaya United.

See also
Football in Thailand
List of football clubs in Thailand

References

1989 births
Living people
Wasan Charam
Wasan Charam
Association football midfielders